San Matías may refer to:
 San Matías, Honduras
 San Matías, Santa Cruz, Bolivia
 San Matías, La Libertad, El Salvador
 San Matías Municipality, Santa Cruz, Bolivia
 San Matías, Taco, Santa Cruz de Tenerife